Colonel Sir John McMahon, 1st Baronet (c. 1754 – 12 September 1817) was an Irish-born politician and Private Secretary to the Sovereign 1811–1817.

Biography  
He was born in Limerick, son of John MacMahon, comptroller of the port of Limerick; little is known of his mother, and even her name is uncertain. By his second wife, Mary Stackpoole, his father has two other sons William and Thomas, who both achieved distinction.

McMahon was commissioned into the 44th Foot, and later transferred to the 48th Foot and the 87th Foot. He served as a Member of Parliament for Aldeburgh from 1802 to 1812. He was Paymaster of Widows Pensions in 1812. He was Keeper of the Privy Purse, Auditor of the Duchy of Cornwall, and Secretary to the Duke of Cornwall. A proposal that he receive a salary of £2,000 as Private Secretary was rejected by Parliament in 1812.

McMahon was appointed a Privy Counsellor in 1812, and died in 1817, having been made a Baronet shortly before his death. He was succeeded in the baronetcy according to a special remainder by his brother General Sir Thomas McMahon, 2nd Baronet. He undoubtedly used his position to benefit his family: his half-brother William MacMahon obtained the coveted judicial office of Master of the Rolls in Ireland through John's influence, and he proved to be a popular and respected judge.

He had no children, but his title passed by special remainder to his brother Thomas.

He had at least one sister Mrs O'Halloran, whose daughter married Richard Lalor Sheil, against her own family's wishes, and died young in childbirth.

Literary references 
He is a minor character in Georgette Heyer's novel Regency Buck, which shows him in a rather unflattering light.

References

External links 
 

1754 births
1817 deaths
Members of the Parliament of the United Kingdom for English constituencies
48th Regiment of Foot officers
87th (Royal Irish Fusiliers) Regiment of Foot officers
Members of the Privy Council of the United Kingdom
Baronets in the Baronetage of the United Kingdom
UK MPs 1802–1806
UK MPs 1806–1807
UK MPs 1807–1812
44th Regiment of Foot officers
Private Secretaries to the Sovereign